The Chairman of the Supreme Council of the Republic of Karakalpakstan is highest state position and the head of the Republic of Karakalpakstan. They chair the Supreme Council of Karakalpakstan. It was preceded by the office of President of the Republic and Chairman of the Supreme Soviet before that. The current chairman is Amanbai Orynbaev since August 2022.

List

Chairmen of the Supreme Soviet

Presidents of Karalpakastan

Chairmen of the Supreme Council

References

Sources 
World Statesmen.org

Notes 

Karakalpakstan, Parliament, Chairmen
Karakalpakstan, Parliament